Michael Sucsy (born February 14, 1973) is an American film director, screenwriter, and producer. He is best known for directing the HBO film Grey Gardens and The Vow.

Early life and education
Sucsy was raised in Connecticut and New York City. He is a graduate of Deerfield Academy, Georgetown University's Edmund A. Walsh School of Foreign Service, where he earned a degree in International Relations, Law & Organization, and the Art Center College of Design in Pasadena, CA, where he received a Masters in Fine Arts.

Film career
Sucsy segued from studying international relations to film production via the advertising industry, where he worked for the award-winning agency Cliff Freeman & Partners on the first-ever Staples t.v. ads. Sucsy then pursued work as a production assistant, an art department coordinator, a production secretary, and an assistant director on feature films, commercials, and music videos in Washington DC, New York City, and Los Angeles. He later went on to earn a Masters of Fine Arts in film from Art Center College of Design in Los Angeles. Sucsy then began directing commercials and was soon dubbed by Shoot! Magazine "as one of the industry's crop of new directors to watch." He was subsequently nominated for the Young Director of the Year Award given in conjunction with the 2002 Cannes Lions International Advertising Festival.

Grey Gardens
In 2003, Sucsy was inspired to write and direct a narrative feature film about the famous true story of Jackie O's eccentric relatives "Big Edie" Bouvier Beale and "Little Edie" Bouvier Beale called Grey Gardens after viewing the well-known documentary of the same name. The day after he first watched the documentary, Sucsy embarked on what was to become a six-year process to get Grey Gardens made. He used primary sources including Little Edie's personal correspondence, private journals, and poetry as well as interviews with family members and friends as the basis of his original script which traced the Beales' tragic descent from riches to rags over some forty years. With Drew Barrymore and Jessica Lange attached to star as the reclusive mother-daughter duo, the project made its way to HBO who, in 2006, announced that Grey Gardens was moving into production with Sucsy as its director. Principal photography on Grey Gardens began in October 2007, and it debuted on HBO in April 2009 to great acclaim from critics and audiences, both new and old to the Grey Gardens phenomenon.

The film received multiple awards: 6 Primetime Emmy Awards including Best Made for Television Movie, the Golden Globe for Best Motion Picture Made for Television, and both the Broadcast Film Critics and the Television Critics Association Awards for Best Television Movie. Sucsy was additionally nominated for the Directors Guild of America Award for Directorial Achievement in Movies for Television/Mini-Series as well as the Writers Guild of America Award for Original Long Form Teleplay.

The Vow
Sucsy's follow-up to Grey Gardens was The Vow, a romantic drama set in Chicago, starring Rachel McAdams and Channing Tatum. The Vow was released by Sony Screen Gems and Columbia Pictures on February 10, 2012. It was a critical and commercial success, becoming the eighth highest-grossing romantic drama film since 1980. In an interview with The Advocate's Jeremy Kinser, Sucsy said for his follow-up to Grey Gardens "I wanted to make something for a mainstream audience." He was also pleased with the opportunity to work with Lange a second time. "There are multiple layers to everything she does," he told The Advocate. "I'm not kidding when I say I'd look over and the grips and prop guys who are obviously watching — but not on the same level that I need to watch — their eyes are bugging out and their mouths are agape. We rewrote scenes and deepened scenes for her because you don't want to waste that kind of talent."

Every Day
Sucsy followed up The Vow with the film adaptation of the novel Every Day. The movie was released on February 23, 2018.

Every Day is a 2018 American romantic fantasy drama film directed by Michael Sucsy and written by Jesse Andrews, based on the 2012 novel of the same name by David Levithan. The film stars Angourie Rice as 16-year-old Rhiannon, who falls in love with a traveling soul who wakes each morning in a different body; Justice Smith, Debby Ryan and Maria Bello also star.

Film critic Peter Bradshaw created a new Special Braddie Award for "Every Day" calling it "the quirky film overlooked by the complacent MSM gatekeeper-establishment which might be a future cult classic."

Upcoming projects
On February 26, 2021 Deadline Hollywood announced that New Republic Pictures will co-finance and produce an original holiday musical, A Lot Like Christmas, co-written by Sucsy and composer Elliott Wheeler (Elvis, The Get Down). Sucsy will also direct and produce.

On December 11, 2018 Deadline Hollywood announced that Sucsy will write and direct a film adaptation of Playing to the Gods based on the novel by Peter Rader.

Personal life
Sucsy became engaged to interior designer Demitri Sgourakis on February 14, 2012, Sucsy's 39th birthday. They were married on August 15, 2015, aboard the Midnight Rambler, a sailboat, off the coast of Montauk, N.Y.

Filmography

References

External links
 
 HuffPost: Inspiration in Squalor: How I "Rebuilt" Grey Gardens by Michael Sucsy
 Out Magazine Top 100
 Grey Gardens - Official Website: HBO
 The Advocate: The Cult of Grey Gardens
 Michael Sucsy's Emmy Acceptance Speech - Grey Gardens, Winner For Outstanding Made For Television Movie : 61st PT Emmy Awards 
 FilmTalk Interview: “If you think of a film like a quick tryst and not a love affair, you’re going to run out of steam” Michael Sucsy

Walsh School of Foreign Service alumni
American LGBT screenwriters
LGBT producers
Living people
1973 births
Deerfield Academy alumni
American film directors
American film producers
American male screenwriters
English-language film directors
Screenwriters from New York (state)
Screenwriters from Connecticut
LGBT film directors